Wesley Person Jr. (born August 1, 1995) is an American professional basketball player for Szedeák of the Nemzeti Bajnokság I/A. Person played college basketball for Troy University.

Professional career

Roseto Sharks (2018–2019)
After going undrafted in the 2018 NBA Draft, on July 18, 2018, it was reported that Person signed his first professional basketball contract, a one-year deal with the Roseto Sharks of the Serie A2 Basket.

Maine Red Claws (2019–2020)
On October 26, 2019, Person was selected by the Maine Red Claws with the 4th pick in the 2nd Round of the 2019 NBA G League Draft and was included in the training camp roster, but was later waived on November 9, 2019, before the Maine Red Claws finalized the opening night roster.

Egis Körmend (2020–2021)
On February 19, 2020, the Egis Körmend announced that they had brought Person to replace Erjon Kastrati.

Newcastle Eagles (2021–2022)
On September 8, 2021, the Newcastle Eagles announced that they had signed Person to replace Matt Scott, who had suffered a season-ending injury.

Personal life
Born in Brantley, Alabama, Wesley Person Jr. is the son of former NBA player Wesley Person, and nephew of former NBA player Chuck Person. Wesley Jr.'s cousin, Adrian Person, is a former nationally ranked JUCO basketball player who averaged a national best 31 points per game at Southern Union State Community College in Wadley, Alabama in 1997.

References

External links

NBA.com Profile
Career statistics of Wesley Person at Basketball-Reference.com

1995 births
Living people
American men's basketball players
American expatriate basketball people in Hungary
American expatriate basketball people in Italy
Troy Trojans men's basketball players
Basketball players from Alabama
Point guards